Kumeyaay Community College (formerly D–Q University) is a public community college in the U.S. state of California. Established in 2004 by the Sycuan Band of the Kumeyaay Nation through gaming revenues, it is located on the Sycuan Indian Reservation near El Cajon.

History 
In the 1971, D-Q University was founded by American Indian Ph.D. Jack Forbes (Lenape), and other educational leaders such as David Risling (Hoopa). D-Q University was a partnership between American Indian and Chicano educators and activists during the tumultuous protest years of the late 1960s and early 1970s. Once established, D-Q University was the only American Indian college in California, and one of the first six American Indian colleges in the United States.

Starting in the 1990s, thanks to the visionary commitment to higher education by Kumeyaay Elder Hank Murphy and his wife Shirley Apple Murphy (Oglala Lakota) a D-Q University satellite campus was established on the Sycuan Reservation, which was the home of the Sycuan Band of the Kumeyaay Nation. A number of excellent courses were offered at that time, including Yuman philosophy, Kumeyaay Bird Songs, English as a Second Language, Math, Fire Sciences for the Sycuan Fire Department, and of course the Kumeyaay language.

As a result of a Bureau of Indian Affairs, technicality involving an American Indian-to-Chicano student ratio, and financial issues, the Bureau of Indian Affairs pulled the funding base away from D-Q University and by 2005 it had shut down. However, there is a new D-Q University Board of Trustees, and there are efforts to reestablish D-Q University as a viable institution.

When D-Q University fell into disarray for a lack of funding, plans were underway at Sycuan to start a Kumeyaay College. The possibility of a Kumeyaay College was envisioned for decades by Florence Shipek, Ph.D., whom is an ethnohistorian who worked closely with the Kumeyaay and Luiseno nations for many decades. She foresaw the possibility of bequeathing her life's work to the Kumeyaay Nation and she sent letters to all the Kumeyaay tribal chairmen expressing the need for a Kumeyaay college that would promote the revitalization of Kumeyaay language, culture, and philosophy.

Given that Sycuan was the only place in the Kumeyaay territory that had been offering college classes, it was understood that the Shipek Collection would end up at Sycuan. However, in order to fulfill the wishes of Dr. Shipek, a Kumeyaay College had to be established as a condition of the Kumeyaay Nation receiving the Shipek Archives Collection. A Sycuan Tribal Council Resolution for Kumeyaay Community College was passed in 2004, which led to the founding of the Kumeyaay Community College and the establishment of the Kumeyaay Community College Board of Trustees that same year. The transfer of the Shipek Collection occurred in 2005, and today it forms the basis of the Kumeyaay Community College Library and Archives.

Kumeyaay Community College has Board Members from eight Reservations of the Kumeyaay Nation. In 2006 Kumeyaay Community College added additional courses and with a partnership with Cuyamaca Community College had established a Kumeyaay Studies Certificate. Recently a new Kumeyaay Studies Degree is being offered through the partnership with Cuyamaca College.

Bio 

Kumeyaay Community College promotes a quality education for the Kumeyaay Nation, Diegueño Nation, California Native American Indians, and other individuals interested in a unique and supportive educational experience. The Kumeyaay Community College has better designed programs for students, has online availability to sources and will help the students board their learning management. Kumeyaay Community College is dedicated to creating a program of superior education and academic training through Native people's worldview with an emphasis on the Kumeyaay perspective. Kumeyaay Community College also host the Kumeyaay Nation College Graduation where they honor current Kumeyaay who are graduating. In addition, they also take the time to honor Cultural Practitioners who hold the Kumeyaay traditional knowledge, then they induct them into the Modern Kumeyaay Association

Mission Statement 

The Kumeyaay Community College Archives is dedicated to preserving the cultural knowledge of our ancestors and the knowledge of our current Elders. Support of our Elders as they instruct our communities in the “Way of ’Iipay/Tiipay” is primary. The Kumeyaay Community College Archives is the primary repository of documents, books, diaries, field notes, and other culturally significant items for the Kumeyaay/Diegueño Nation. Some collections may hold documents and material pertaining to other Native American people. In conjunction with the staff and instructors of the Kumeyaay Community College, the Kumeyaay Community College Archives will provide support in research, education, publishing, and linguistic preservation in order to expand the understanding of traditional cultural knowledge. The Kumeyaay Community College will continue to acquire, catalogue, and preserve individual collections of cultural importance to the Kumeyaay/Diegueño Peoples as they become available.

Academics 

The Associate in Arts in Kumeyaay Studies is offered through Cuyamaca College and is designed to provide an understanding of Kumeyaay history, culture and heritage. It is a multi-disciplinary degree, drawing from the sciences, humanities, world languages and history departments. Through specific coursework that encompasses on-site learning experiences, students will learn about the Kumeyaay Nation of San Diego's East County region.

Certificate of Specialization 

Students who complete the requirements below qualify for a Certificate in Kumeyaay Studies. An official request must be filed with the Admissions and Records Office prior to the deadline as stated in the Academic Calendar. Program Learning Outcomes-Upon successful completion of this program, students will be able to:• Communicate in the Kumeyaay language at a basic level in a variety of settings.• Acquire an understanding of Kumeyaay heritage, history, society and traditions.• Gain sensitivity, globalism and cultural competence of a unique group of people.

Staff 

The Kumeyaay Community College Staff has six members who each teach courses to advance the knowledge of students. The staff include the following: Ethan Banegas, Larry Banegas, Martha Rodriguez, Michelle Garcia, Richard Bugbee, and Stan Rodriguez.

·       Ethan Banegas – Luiseno/Kumeyaay

Ethan grew up on the Barona Reservation. He received his bachelor's degree in History, Religious Studies and Political Science in 2009 and his master's degree in January 2017 from the University of San Diego. Ethan is the Kumeyaay Community College Instructor for the Kumeyaay History II courses.

·       Larry Banegas – Kumeyaay/Barona

Larry is the founder and CEO of Kumeyaay.com. He also created the Kumeyaay Spiritual and Healing Center. Larry is a graduate of Cal State Long Beach with bachelor's degree in Speech and Communication. He also has a master's degree in Social Work from San Diego State University. Larry is the Kumeyaay Community College Instructor for Kumeyaay Humanities courses.

·      Martha Rodríguez – Kumeyaay/San José de la Zorra

Martha is continuing family tradition of passing on the knowledge and expertise of the Kumeyaay people to the next generation. Following the wishes of the Elders to keep the Language and Culture alive and vibrant she holds Kumeyaay Cultural Nights once a month. Martha is the Kumeyaay Community College Instructor for Kumeyaay Basketry, Pottery, and Food courses. She also assists with the Kumeyaay Language and Kumeyaay Tools courses.

·       Michelle Garcia

Michelle is a San Diego native who graduated from San Diego State University with her bachelor's degree in Biology, later graduating from the University California of Berkley with her master's degree. She also has been working with faculty and staff in developing an associate degree program in Kumeyaay Studies at Cuyamaca. Michelle is the Kumeyaay Community College Instructor for Kumeyaay Science courses.

·       Richard Bugbee - Luiseno

Richard learned traditional plant uses of Southern California from the late Elder Jane Dumas whom is part Kumeyaay, and from Jamul Indian Village. Richard is the Kumeyaay Community College Instructor for Kumeyaay Ethnobotany and Ethnoecology courses with Michelle Garcia from Cuyamaca College.

·      Stan Rodríguez – Kumeyaay/Lipay/Santa Ysabel

Stan learned from his Grandmother and other Kumeyaay Elders the methods and culture. Stan has an master's degree in Human Behavior and is in a doctoral program at the University California of San Diego. Stan is the Kumeyaay Community College Instructor for Kumeyaay Language I, II, III and Kumeyaay Tools courses.

Board of Trustees Members 

The Kumeyaay Community College Board of Trustees has members representing eight reservations of the Kumeyaay Nation. The Trustees have been working diligently to establish a college, which reflects the culture and mores of the Kumeyaay People. The Kumeyaay Community College Board of Trustees has representatives from: Sycuan-Jamie LaBrake, Santa Ysabel-Stan Rodriguez, Jamul-Alex Hunter, Campo-Paul Cuero, San Pasqual-Lorraine Orosco, Barona-Larry Banegas, and Mesa Grande-Eva Trujillo.

Governance 

The Kumeyaay Community College and the Kumeyaay Community College Board of Trustees has been formed under the authority of Tribal law of the Sycuan Band of the Kumeyaay Nation. The Board of Trustees are representatives of reservations of the Kumeyaay/Diegueño Nation. They reflect the culture and mores of the Kumeyaay People and as such the Kumeyaay Community College Board of Trustees will have sole discretionary control over the policy and procedures of the Kumeyaay Community College Archives.

References

Bibliography

https://www.cuyamaca.edu/academics/departments/wl/naky/default.aspx
https://www.cuyamaca.edu/campus-life/news/files/chronicle/2014-Fall-newsletter.pdf
http://www.eccalifornian.com/article/kumeyaay-bobby-%E2%80%9Cwalking-stick%E2%80%9D-wallace-standing-rock-and-beyond
ediblesandiego.ediblecommunities.com/eat/cooking-kumeyaay-preserving-native-foods
https://festival.si.edu/2016/sounds-of-california/marta-and-stan-rodriguez/smithsonian
http://www.kpbs.org/news/2015/nov/01/american-indian-heritage-month-stan-rodriguez/
https://www.kumeyaay.com/
https://www.eastcountymagazine.org/kumeyaay-community-college
http://www.sandiegouniontribune.com/news/education/sd-me-kumeyaay-college-20170829-story.html
http://sctca.org/kumeyaay-com

External links
Official website

California Community Colleges
Educational institutions established in 2004
Kumeyaay
Universities and colleges in San Diego County, California
2004 establishments in California